The Southern Conference League is a British rugby league division in the Rugby Football League's tier 4. It is the highest level of amateur rugby league in the South of England and South Wales. It was one of the leagues that replaced Rugby League Conference. The competition was first played between 2012 and 2016, and was relaunched in 2019 after a two-year hiatus.

History
The Conference League South was founded in 2012 as a result of restructuring of the community game which saw the Rugby League Conference (RLC)  broken up into regional leagues covering Britain and the heartlands National Conference League (NCL) move to a summer season. Some RLC sides joined a newly formed National Conference League Division 3 for a single season and applied for full membership of the NCL the following season.

The Conference League South was created for sides outside the rugby league heartlands of the North of England that wanted a higher standard of rugby league than the Midlands Rugby League Premier Division or the South Premier but were not yet ready to join the NCL.

Northampton Demons and St Albans Centurions were replaced with Oxford Cavaliers and Valley Cougars in 2014 however Oxford Cavaliers failed to complete the season. Bristol Sonics dropped down to the West of England Rugby League in 2015 which allowed four new clubs to join; Gloucestershire Warriors, Coventry Bears Reserves, Torfaen Tigers and Raiders RL alongside the return of Oxford Cavaliers.

London Chargers were promoted to compete in 2016 alongside a new reserve side from University of Gloucestershire All Golds with Gloucestershire Warriors, Leicester Storm, Oxford Cavaliers and Sheffield Hallam Eagles dropping out.

At the end of the 2016 season, it was announced that the Conference League South season would not take place in 2017, and teams would return to their respective regional leagues. In May 2017, the RFL announced plans to introduce a new Southern League competition from 2018 onwards.

The Conference League South was reintroduced for the 2019 season as the Southern Conference League, split into geographic Eastern and Western divisions, with the Hammersmith Hills Hoists winning the first title under the tournament's new name. The 2020 season was abandoned due to the COVID-19 pandemic, but the competition resumed in 2021, with a maiden title for Wests Warriors beating local rivals London Chargers 20 points to 10.

Clubs

Results

Winners

See also

National Conference League

References

External links

Rugby Football League
BARLA competitions
Rugby league in the United Kingdom
Rugby league competitions in the United Kingdom